Hassan Ebrahim Habibi (29 January 1937 – 31 January 2013) was an Iranian politician, lawyer, scholar and the first first vice president from 1989 until 2001 under Presidents Akbar Hashemi Rafsanjani and Mohammad Khatami. He was also a member of the High Council of Cultural Revolution and head of Academy of Persian Language and Literature from 2004 until his death in 2013.

Early life and education
Habibi was born on 29 January 1937. He studied sociology in France. He held a PhD in law and sociology. When he was a university student he visited Khomeini while the latter was in exile.

Career
Habibi was tasked by Ayatollah Khomenei to draft the prospective constitution of Iran when the latter was in exile in Paris. His version was heavily modified due to criticisms and the final text was approved by the election in November 1979.

Following the Iranian revolution, Habibi was named public spokesman for the revolutionary council. He was among the main architects of the first draft of Constitution of the Islamic Republic of Iran, which was later passed for more discussion to an elected Assembly of Experts for Constitution. The assembly made significant changes in the original draft, e.g. by introducing the new position of "leader of the Islamic Republic" based on Khomeini's concept of Guardianship of the Islamic Jurists, which gave almost unlimited power to the clergy. The modified version was approved in a popular referendum in 1979. In the 1980 presidential election, Habibi run for office, but received only ten percent of the vote against Banisadr's seventy percent. Habibi was backed by Mohammad Beheshti in the election process. In the same year he won a parliamentary seat, being a representative of the Islamic Republican Party.

Habibi served as the minister of justice under Prime Minister Mousavi. He was first vice president of Iran from 1989 to 2001, eight years under President Rafsanjani and then four years under President Khatami. He was replaced by Mohammad Reza Aref in the post in Khatami's second term. He was also head of the Academy of Persian Language and Literature and a member of the Expediency Council.

Death
Habibi died on 31 January 2013. He was buried at the mausoleum of Imam Khomeini in Tehran on 1 February. The funeral service was attended by leading Iranian political figures, including President Ahmedinejad.

Work
Habibi is the author of several books, including God (1981), Society, Culture, Politics (1984), Islam and the Crisis of Our Time (1984), In the Mirror Of Rights: Views Of International Rights, Comparative Rights And Sociology (1988), Seeking the Roots (editing & translation) (1994), Casework of An Ages Student (1997), One Word Out Of Thousands (2 vol.) (1998-2001) and General International Rights (2 vol.) (2003).

Political affiliation 
Habibi was director of the National Front publications in Europe during the 1960s. In the capacity, he was involved in publication and distribution of Payam-e-Daneshjou, organ of the party's student wing.

Habibi was a member of the Freedom Movement of Iran, before he defected to the Islamic Republican Party after the Iranian Revolution.

References

1937 births
2013 deaths
Deputies of Tehran, Rey, Shemiranat and Eslamshahr
First vice presidents of Iran
Government ministers of Iran
Freedom Movement of Iran MPs
Executives of Construction Party politicians
Members of the Expediency Discernment Council
Candidates in the 1980 Iranian presidential election
Members of the Academy of Persian Language and Literature
People of the Iranian Revolution
Members of the 1st Islamic Consultative Assembly
Recipients of the Order of Knowledge
Islamic Republican Party politicians
Spokespersons of the Government of Iran
Members of the Guardian Council
Ministers of Justice of Iran
National Front (Iran) student activists
Iranian politicians who have crossed the floor
Iranian Science and Culture Hall of Fame recipients in Humanities
Politicians from Tehran

de:Hassan Habibi
fr:Hassan Habibi
it:Hassan Habibi